The Mexican Communist Party (PCM) was a communist party in Mexico. It was founded in 1917 as the Socialist Workers' Party (PSO) by Manabendra Nath Roy, a left-wing Indian revolutionary. The PSO changed its name to the Mexican Communist Party in November 1919. It was outlawed in 1925 and remained illegal until 1935, during the presidency of the leftist Lázaro Cárdenas. The PCM saw in the left wing of the nationalist regime that emerged from the Mexican Revolution a progressive force to be supported—i.e. Cárdenas and his allies. In the end, the PCM disappeared after helping form the Party of the Democratic Revolution, a split from the PRI led by the son of Lázaro Cárdenas, Cuauhtémoc Cárdenas.

The PCM later lost its registration in 1946 because it did not meet the new requirements of at least 30,000 registered members in at least 21 of Mexico's 31 states and the Federal District. It is not clear whether the party was unable to recruit enough members or whether, fearing repression, it refused to turn membership rolls over to the Secretary of the Interior, then in charge of elections.

Over the next 30 years, the party had some minor influence in the Confederation of Mexican Workers (CTM) and among the intelligentsia of Mexico City. In the mid-1960s the U.S. State Department estimated the party membership to be approximately 50,000 (0.28% of the working-age population of the country).

In 1976 the party nominated Valentín Campa as its presidential candidate, competing (unofficially) against José López Portillo. Following the electoral reform of 1977 that lowered the barrier for parties to get on the ballot, the PCM regained temporary registration for the 1979 mid-term elections. After its poor showing and a two decade-long period of moderation during which it adopted a "Eurocommunist" position, the PCM merged with three other far-left political parties in November 1981 and became the Unified Socialist Party of Mexico (PSUM). Most members of the PSUM then merged with somewhat more moderate left-wing groups to form the Mexican Socialist Party (PMS) in 1987. The PMS never competed in national elections alone, having joined the National Democratic Front (FDN)—a split from the ruling Revolutionary Institutional Party (PRI)—to support the presidential bid of Cuauhtémoc Cárdenas in 1988. What was the PMS was then absorbed into the newly formed Party of the Democratic Revolution (PRD) in 1989.

Secretaries-General of the Mexican Communist Party
1959–1963 Collective Secretariat of the Mexican Communist Party
1963–1981 Arnoldo Martínez Verdugo

References

Further reading
Barry Carr, Marxism & Communism in Twentieth-Century Mexico (University of Nebraska Press, 1992) 
Bruhn, Kathleen Taking on Goliath: The Emergence of a New Left Party and the Struggle for Democracy in Mexico (Pennsylvania State University Press, 1997)

Defunct political parties in Mexico
Mexico
Communist parties in Mexico
Political parties established in 1911
Political parties disestablished in 1989
Defunct communist parties
1911 establishments in Mexico
1989 disestablishments in Mexico